Shi You (48–33 BC) was a Chinese calligrapher, eunuch, and writer of the Han dynasty, who served as Director of Eunuch Attendants under Emperor Yuan of Han. 

He authored the dictionary Jijiupian in  40 BC and is believed to be the inventor of cursive script.

References

1st-century BC Chinese calligraphers
1st-century BC Chinese writers
Han dynasty calligraphers
Han dynasty eunuchs
Han dynasty writers